Wellington Bank is a steep railway embankment and associated climb located on the Bristol to Exeter line, that climbs from just northeast of Wellington, Somerset, until its peak at Sampford Arundel, where it enters Whiteball tunnel and travels under the Whiteball Hill.

Background

The Bristol & Exeter Railway was authorised by act of Parliament in 1836, following quickly on the 1835 act for construction of the Great Western Railway. Bristol merchants were anxious to secure a railway route to Exeter, which was an important commercial centre, and which had a harbour on the south coast, in the English Channel. Coastal shipping from the South coast and from continental Europe making for Bristol needed to navigate the hazardous north Cornwall coast after negotiating the waters round Land's End.

Isambard Kingdom Brunel was appointed engineer, and his assistant William Gravatt surveyed the route in 1835 and was resident engineer for the section between Bristol and White Ball, with William Froude supervising the section from Whiteball to Exeter. Brunel himself was in charge of the design of White Ball tunnel.

The first , broad gauge, section of the line was completed to Bridgwater on 14 June 1841, and the extension to Taunton in July 1842 – both using trains leased from the Great Western. At Norton Fitzwarren just west of Taunton, the intention was to split the railway three ways:
A branchline via the West Somerset Railway to Minehead
A junction with the Devon and Somerset Railway, a secondary route to Barnstaple
The mainline to Exeter via Wellington

Construction
From Creech St Michael westwards, the B&ER had followed the gently flowing valley of the River Tone. But just east of Wellington, the river moved further west up the steep sides of the Blackdown Hills. Brunel chose to follow a smaller valley eastwards, and pass under the Blackdowns further west, through a place called White Ball, a hill made up of easy to dig white sandstone (NB: next to it is Red Ball, a hill of red sandstone). This route would reduce the need for additional tunnelling, and allow connection with and traffic from Wellington. However, the choice also meant the construction of a long inclined bank, with a tunnel at its peak.

Wellington station opened when the line reached the town on 1 May 1843, laid out as a standard Brunel railway station.

Digging of the tunnel commenced in 1842. A temporary terminus was established in the hamlet of Beam Bridge on 1 May 1843, from which passengers were taken by carriage to the far side of the hill, and then taken by another train from Burlescombe, Devon to Exeter.

From January 1842, 1,000 navvies were encamped at White Ball. With access to a local Tommy shop, they sank 14 vertical shafts during the  tunnel's construction. The temporary terminus at Beam Bridge stayed in place for a year, until the tunnel was opened on 1 May 1844.

Operations
The Bristol & Exeter Railway was a considerable financial success and between 1844 and 1874, paying an average annual dividend of 4.5 per cent. The city fathers of Exeter refused the railway access to the dock of the Exeter Canal until 35 years after it entered the city in 1844. The railway was fully amalgamated with the Great Western Railway on 1 January 1876.

Due to the steepness of the bank, special operational procedures were required.

Northbound heavy goods trains would stop south of Whiteball tunnel, often at Tiverton Junction, and pin their brakes as appropriate.
Southbound trains would stop at Wellington, where a banking locomotive would be applied to the rear of the train. This would bank the train up the embankment and through the tunnel, before releasing itself before Tiverton, where it would reverse back down the bank.

With the full introduction of higher powered diesel locomotives, the banking procedure was ceased in the late 1960s.

100mph speed record

On 9 May 1904, whilst descending Wellington Bank, the GWR 3700 Class No. 3440 City of Truro was timed at 8.8 seconds between two quarter-mile posts, whilst hauling the "Ocean Mails" special from Plymouth to London Paddington. This timing was recorded from the train by Charles Rous-Marten, who wrote for The Railway Magazine and other journals.

Initially, mindful of the need to preserve their reputation for safety, the railway company allowed only the overall timings for the run to be put into print; neither The Times report of the following day nor Rous-Marten's article in The Railway Magazine of June 1904 mentioned the maximum speed. However the morning after the run two local Plymouth newspapers did report that the train had reached a speed between 99 and 100 miles an hour whilst descending Wellington Bank. This claim was based on the stopwatch timings of a postal worker, William Kennedy, who was also on the train.

Rous-Marten first published the maximum speed in 1905, though he did not name the locomotive or railway company:

Before his death in 1908 Rous-Marten did name the locomotive as City of Truro. Official confirmation from the Great Western Railway came in 1922 when they published a letter written in June 1905 by Rous-Marten to James Inglis, the general manager, giving further details of the record.

This sequence of eight quarter-mile timings is thought to start at milepost 173, the first after the tunnel, with the maximum speed at milepost 171.

From 1922 onwards City of Truro featured prominently in the Great Western Railway's publicity material.

Doubts over the record centred on the power of the locomotive and some contradictions in Rous-Marten's passing times. However his milepost timings are consistent with a speed of 100 mph or just over. The latest research examines the evidence and uses computer simulation of the locomotive performance to show that a speed of 100 mph was possible and that the timings do indeed support such a speed.

This record was set before any car or aeroplane had attained such a speed. However, in May 1904 City of Truro was not the fastest vehicle in the world, as  had been reached the previous year on an experimental electric railway near Berlin.

References

Railway inclines in the United Kingdom
Rail transport in Somerset
Bristol and Exeter Railway
Works of Isambard Kingdom Brunel
Wellington, Somerset